Braničevo may refer to:

 , a region in Serbia
 Braničevo Fortress, a fortress in Serbia, in Selo Kostolac
 Braničevo District, a district in Serbia
 Braničevo (Golubac), a village in Serbia, in the municipality of Golubac
 Serbian Orthodox Eparchy of Braničevo, an eparchy (diocese) of the Serbian Orthodox Church
 Siege of Braničevo (1154)
 Braničevo (magazine), a literary magazine published in Požarevac since 1955